Molezuelas de la Carballeda is a municipality located in the province of Zamora, Castile and León, Spain. According to the 2004 census (INE), the municipality has a population of 87 inhabitants.

See also
La Carballeda

References

Municipalities of the Province of Zamora